Moreilles is a commune in the Vendée department, Pays de la Loire region, western France. It is located 10 km south east of Luçon.

See also
Communes of the Vendée department

References

Communes of Vendée